Tolypella prolifera is a species of stonewort belonging to the family Characeae.

Synonym:
 Chara prolifera Ziz ex A.Braun, 1834 (= basionym)

References

Charophyta